Tadeusz Żychiewicz (12 January 1922 in Bratkowice – 11 November 1994 in Kraków) was a Polish journalist, art historian, religious publicist, theologist, Biblicist, feuilletonist and editor of Tygodnik Powszechny, soldier of Armia Krajowa.

Notable works
 Publication series
 Cnoty i niecnoty (released as a book)
 Poczta Ojca Malachiasza (released as a book)

 Books
 Dom Ojca: Rok Mateusza, rok Marka, rok Łukasza
 Dziesięcioro przykazań
 Ignacy Loyola
 Jajko miejscami świeże, czyli Pytania dla teologów
 Josafat Kuncevič
 Ludzie Ziemi Nieświętej (collection of articles)
 Ludzkie drogi (collection of Żychiewicz's publications from Tygodnik Powszechny)
 Rok Łukasza
 Rok Marka
 Rok Mateusza
 Stare Przymierze
 Stare Przymierze. Exodus
 Stare Przymierze. Genesis
 Stare Przymierze. Kohelet, Hiob, Syracydes
 Stare Przymierze. Prorocy: Izajasz, Jeremiasz, Ezechiel
 Stare Przymierze. Rut, Dawid, Salomon
 Żywoty

References
 
 

1922 births
1994 deaths
People from Rzeszów County
Home Army members
Polish art historians
Polish publicists
Polish theologians
Polish male writers
20th-century Polish historians
20th-century male writers
20th-century Polish journalists